Kakkattar is a tributary of the Pamba River, the third longest river in the South Indian state of Kerala. This river passes through the places like Ranni-Perunad, Maniyar, Manakkayam, Seethathodu, Angamoozhy, Kochandy, Kakkad and Moozhiyar.

Rivers of Pathanamthitta district
Pamba River